In computing, a Unicode symbol is a Unicode character which is not part of a script used to write a natural language, but is nonetheless available for use as part of a text.

Many of the symbols are drawn from existing character sets or ISO/IEC or other national and international standards. The Unicode Standard states that "The universe of symbols is rich and open-ended," but that in order to be considered, a symbol must have a "demonstrated need or strong desire to exchange in plain text." This makes the issue of what symbols to encode and how symbols should be encoded more complicated than the issues surrounding writing systems. Unicode focuses on symbols that make sense in a one-dimensional plain-text context. For example, the typical two-dimensional arrangement of electronic diagram symbols justifies their exclusion. (Box-drawing characters are a partial exception, for legacy purposes, and a number of electronic diagram symbols are indeed encoded in Unicode's Miscellaneous Technical block.) For adequate treatment in plain text, symbols must also be displayable in a monochromatic setting. Even with these limitations monochromatic, one-dimensional and standards-based the domain of potential Unicode symbols is extensive. (However, emojis ideograms, graphic symbols that were admitted into Unicode, allow colors although the colors are not standardized.)

Symbol block list 

 Alphanumeric variants (based on Latin characters in Unicode)
 Currency Symbols (U+20A0–U+20CF)
 General Punctuation (U+2000–U+206F)
 Letterlike Symbols (U+2100–U+214F)
 Number Forms (U+2150–U+218F)
 Phonetic symbols (including IPA) (various blocks)
 Superscripts and Subscripts (U+2070–U+209F)
 Enclosed variants
 Enclosed Alphanumeric Supplement (1F100–1F1FF)
 Enclosed Alphanumerics (U+2460–U+24FF)
 Enclosed Ideographic Supplement (1F200–1F2FF)
 Arrows
 Arrows (U+2190–U+21FF)
 Dingbats arrows (U+2794–U+27BF)
 Miscellaneous Symbols and Arrows (U+2B00–U+2BFF)
 Supplemental Arrows-A (U+27F0–U+27FF)
 Supplemental Arrows-B (U+2900–U+297F)
 Supplemental Arrows-C (U+1F800-U+1F8FF)
 Mathematical
 Mathematical Alphanumeric Symbols (U+1D400–U+1D7FF)
 Mathematical Operators (U+2200–U+22FF)
 Miscellaneous Mathematical Symbols-A (U+27C0–U+27EF)
 Miscellaneous Mathematical Symbols-B (U+2980–U+29FF)
 Symbols and Pictographs Extended-A (U+1FA70–1FAFF)
 Supplemental Mathematical Operators (U+2A00–U+2AFF)
 Technical
 Control Pictures (U+2400–U+243F)
 Miscellaneous Technical (U+2300–U+23FF)
 Optical Character Recognition (U+2440–U+245F)
 Musical
 Znamenny Musical Notation (U+1CF00–1CFCF)
 Ancient Greek Musical Notation (U+1D200–U+1D24F)
 Byzantine Musical Symbols (U+1D000–U+1D0FF)
 Musical Symbols (U+1D100–U+1D1FF)
 Games
 Chess Symbols (U+1FA00–1FA6F)
 Domino Tiles (U+1F030–U+1F09F)
 Mahjong Tiles (U+1F000–U+1F02F)
 Playing Cards (U+1F0A0–U+1F0FF)
 Emoji and emoticons
 Dingbat (U+2700–U+27BF)
 Emoticons (U+1F600–U+1F64F)
 Miscellaneous Symbols (U+2600–U+26FF)
 Miscellaneous Symbols and Pictographs (U+1F300–U+1F5FF)
 Supplemental Symbols and Pictographs (U+1F900–1F9FF)
 Symbols and Pictographs Extended-A
 Transport and Map Symbols (U+1F680..U+1F6FF)
 Additional emoji can be found in the following Unicode blocks: Arrows, Basic Latin, CJK Symbols and Punctuation, Enclosed Alphanumeric Supplement, Enclosed Alphanumerics, Enclosed CJK Letters and Months, Enclosed Ideographic Supplement, General Punctuation, Geometric Shapes, Geometric Shapes, Latin-1 Supplement, Letterlike Symbols, Mahjong Tiles, Miscellaneous Symbols and Arrows, Miscellaneous Technical, Playing Cards, and Supplemental Arrows-B.
 Miscellaneous
 Alchemical Symbols (1F700–1F77F)
 Arabic Mathematical Alphabetic Symbols (1EE00–1EEFF)
 Block Elements (U+2580–U+259F)
 Box Drawing (U+2500–U+257F)
 CJK Compatibility (U+3300–33FF)
 Combining Diacritical Marks for Symbols (U+20D0–U+20FF)
 Common Indic Number Forms (U+A830–A83F)
 Counting Rod Numerals (U+1D360–1D37F)
 Enclosed CJK Letters and Months (U+3200–32FF)
 Geometric Shapes (U+25A0–U+25FF)
 Geometric Shapes Extended (U+1F780-U+1F7FF)
 Indic Siyaq Numbers (U+1EC70–1ECBF)
 Kaktovik Numerals (U+1D2C0–1D2DF)
 Mayan Numerals (U+1D2E0–1D2FF)
 Miscellaneous Symbols and Arrows (U+2B00–U+2BFF)
 Ornamental Dingbats (U+1F650-U+1F67F)
 Ottoman Siyaq Numbers (U+1ED00–1ED4F)
 Religious and political symbols (various blocks)
 Rumi Numeral Symbols (U+10E60–10E7F)
 Supplemental Punctuation (U+2E00–2E7F)
 Symbols for Legacy Computing (U+1FB00–1FBFF)
 Tai Xuan Jing Symbols (U+1D300–1D35F)
 Yijing Hexagram Symbols (U+4DC0–4DFF)

See also 
 Special characters
 Unicode block
 Universal Character Set characters

References

External links 
 Unicode character code charts
 Draft Unicode Technical Report #25: Unicode Support for Mathematics
   shapecatcher.com — Search through characters by sketching one.

Unicode
Unicode